The following is a list of countries by raw aluminium exports. Data is for 2016, in millions of United States dollars, as reported by The Observatory of Economic Complexity. Currently the top ten countries are listed.

References
 Observatory of Economic complexity - Countries that export Raw Aluminium (2012)
 Observatory of Economic complexity - Countries that export Raw Aluminium (2016)

Aluminium
Exports
Aluminium